Calypso was a 40-gun Gloire-class frigate of the French Navy, built after plans designed by Sané revised by Forfait. Under Captain Louis-Léon Jacob, she took part in the Battle of Les Sables-d'Olonne, where she sustained very severe damage.

Career 
The frigate was ordered on 6 April 1803 in Nantes from the Crucy brothers, but on 14 October, it was ordered that her construction take place in Lorient instead. On 16 September, she took her name of Calypso. On 5 December 1806, she was commissioned under  Captain Louis-Léon Jacob. 

In 1809, she was attached to a three-frigate squadron under Commodore Jurien de La Gravière, on Italienne, along with Cybèle. In the ensuing Battle of Les Sables-d'Olonne, Calypso sustained extensive damage and was driven ashore, but managed to take shelter in Les Sables-d'Olonne harbour.

Unable to effect heavy repairs, Calypso remained stranded in Les Sables-d'Olonne harbour in her battered state, until she was struck from the navy list in January 1813. She was eventually sold for use as a merchantman circa 1814.

References

 
 

1807 ships
Gloire-class frigates
Ships built in France
Maritime incidents in 1809
Shipwrecks in the Bay of Biscay